The Uranium Conspiracy (or Restrisiko 100%) is a 1978 Israeli-German-Italian action-thriller film directed by Gianfranco Baldanello (here credited as Frank G. Carroll) and Menahem Golan.

Plot

Cast

 Fabio Testi as Renzo 
 Janet Agren as Helga 
 Assi Dayan as Dan 
 Siegfried Rauch as The Baron 
 Oded Kotler as Meyer 
 Gianni Rizzo as The Captain 
 Herbert Fux as Ulrich

References

External links

1978 films
1970s action thriller films
1970s buddy films
1970s spy thriller films
Films about the Mossad
Films about nuclear war and weapons
Films directed by Gianfranco Baldanello
Films directed by Menahem Golan
Films set in Amsterdam
Films set in Italy
Films set in the Mediterranean Sea
German spy thriller films
German action thriller films
Israeli action thriller films
Italian buddy films
Italian spy thriller films
Italian action thriller films
West German films
Films scored by Lallo Gori
Constantin Film films
Films produced by Menahem Golan
1970s German-language films
1970s Italian films
1970s German films